Thorpe Hay Meadow is a  biological Site of Special Scientific Interest west of Staines-upon-Thames in Surrey. It is owned  and managed by the Surrey Wildlife Trust.

Its habitat is (acid-alkali) neutral grassland and it contains Cynosurus cristatus - Centaurea nigra grassland as a notified feature.

A footpath from Staines passes through the site.

References

Surrey Wildlife Trust
Sites of Special Scientific Interest in Surrey